Husum may refer to:

 Husum, Washington,  an unincorporated community in the White Salmon River Valley in the state of Washington
 Husum, a town in Schleswig-Holstein, Germany
 Husum, Lower Saxony, a municipality in Lower Saxony, Germany
 Husum, Sweden, a municipality in Sweden
 Husum (Copenhagen), a neighbourhood in Copenhagen, Denmark
 Husum, another name for the Danish Protest Pig breed